Stare Misto Lviv Rock Fest was a music festival which took place in Lviv, Ukraine annually between 2007 and 2013. It was organised by the First Private Brewery (Преша Приватна Броварня), a local brewery. Despite its small scale, it was occasionally referred to as one of the best festivals in Ukraine. It featured both Ukrainian and European bands, such as Kaiser Chiefs, Esthetic Education, Gogol Bordello, IAMX, Archive, Okean Elzy, and The Subways among others.

History

2007 
The first Stare Misto Festival took place on 10 June 2007 at the Bohdan Khmelnytsky Culture and Leisure Park. It was organised as a free event. The line-up consisted of:

 Bozhychi
 Karpatiyany
 Pivo Vdvoem
 Lilya Vavrin
 VovaZIL’Vova (Headliner)

2008 
The second Stare Misto Festival became a two-day event, taking place on 31 May to 1 June 2008, at the same venue. Due to the high costs of the festival, it was decided that this was the last time it would be organised for free. The line-up consisted of:

First day:
 Serebryanaya Svadba
 Pivo Vdvoem
 Zdob si Zdub
 Vopli Vidopliassova (Headliner)
Second Day:
 S.K.A.Y.
 Esthetic Education
 Okean Elzy (Headliner)

2009 
From 2009 the festival was held at a new venue, the Ukraina Stadium in Lviv. This was also the first year tickets were enforced. The line-up consisted of:

 Mad Heads XL
 Haydamaky
 Vopli Vidopliassova
 Korpiklaani
 Splean
 Gogol Bordello (Headliner)

2010 
The 2010 edition took place once again at the Ukraina Stadium, on 22 May 2010. The line-up consisted of:
 DJ Scratchy
 The Urban Voodoo Machine
 The Dreadnoughts
 IAMX
 Goran Bregovic Wedding and Funeral Band
 Okean Elzy (Headliner)

2011 
The festival took place on 28 May 2011 at the Ukraina Stadium. The line-up consisted of:
 La Phaze
 Talco
 Perkalaba (Unannounced)
 Rotfront
 Poets of the Fall
 IAMX
 Emir Kusturica and the No Smoking Orchestra (Headliner)

2012 
The festival didn't take place in 2012 due to schedule conflicts with Lviv's hosting the Euro 2012.

2013 
The final edition of the festival took place on 8-9 June on the Ukraina Stadium. The festival, for the first time since 2008, became a two-day event. In subsequent years, due to profitability concerns, it was not organised anymore. The line-up consisted of:

First Day:
 Epolets
 Lyapis Trubetskoy
 Che Sudaka
 Archive
 IAMX (Headliner)
 Goran Bregovic

Second Day:
 Mufftrain
 Fiddler's Green
 Leningrad Cowboys
 The Subways
 Kaiser Chiefs (Headliner)
 DDT

References 

Music festivals in Ukraine
Culture in Lviv
Rock festivals in Ukraine